Cheirodon galusdae is a species of fish in the family Characidae endemic to Chile.

Named in honor of Piedro Galusda, superintendent of the state hatchery at Lautaro, where he planned the collecting of fish during Eigenmann’s expedition.

References

Cheirodon
Freshwater fish of Chile
Fish described in 1928
Taxa named by Carl H. Eigenmann
Taxonomy articles created by Polbot
Endemic fauna of Chile